Military Avenue is a central thoroughfare located in Omaha, Nebraska. A segment of the road located at the junction of West 82nd and Fort Streets was listed on the National Register of Historic Places in 1993. Today Military Road, which begins at Nebraska Highway 64 as Nebraska Highway L-28K, ends at Bennington Road near North 204th Street (Nebraska Highway 31).

History
Originally part of the Overland Trail, Military Avenue was laid out from Downtown Omaha westward through the town of Benson and past in 1857 by Captain Edward Beckwith for the U.S. Army. Originally designated as a shipment road for moving military supplies to Fort Kearny, thousands of travelers moving to the Pacific Northwest used the road for the next fifty years. Purposely laid out over high ground, emigrants and freighters had a clear view of the surrounding country as a protection against attacks.

Currently
The original graded wagon track can be seen near the Omaha Public Power District substation located near North 90th and Fort Streets. A section of the road is listed on the National Register of Historic Places.

See also 
 Ackerhurst Dairy Barn
 Benson, Nebraska

Elsewhere online 
 "A History of the Military Road in North Omaha" by Adam Fletcher Sasse for NorthOmahaHistory.com

References

National Register of Historic Places in Omaha, Nebraska
Streets in Omaha, Nebraska
Roads on the National Register of Historic Places in Nebraska
Military roads